Best of the Early Years may refer to:

The Best of the Early Years (B.B. King album), 2007
The Best of the Early Years: 1990–1995, a compilation album by Buju Banton
Beginnings: The Best of the Early Years, a greatest hits compilation album by Clannad
Shine: The Best of the Early Years, a compilation album by David Gray
Best of the Early Years (Glen Campbell album)
Best of the Early Years (Jimmy Buffett album)
Best of the Early Years (They Might Be Giants album), 1999